Weatherbox is a five-CD limited-edition box set by David Sylvian, released in 1989. Only 5000 copies were produced. The set comprises Sylvian's first four albums: Brilliant Trees, Alchemy: An Index of Possibilities, Gone to Earth and Secrets of the Beehive; and was, at the time, the only way to acquire all of the songs from Gone to Earth on compact disc.

Weatherbox is notable for giving each disc entirely new artwork based around the classical elements. The second half of Gone to Earth was retitled Gone to Earth Instrumental for this box set. The song "Preparations for a Journey" from Alchemy was removed, despite being part of the original album, and replaced by two tracks issued as B-sides to the "Pop Song" single. Gone to Earth was quietly remastered for Weatherbox. Also, the re-recorded "Forbidden Colours (Version)" included on the original CD of Secrets of the Beehive was removed.

The art for Weatherbox was designed by Russell Mills and Dave Coppenhall, and included a poster featuring Sylvian's discography on one side and art by Russell Mills on the other. The liner notes for Weatherbox were provided by Steve Lake, with photos by Russell Mills and Alistar Thain. A Japanese edition of the box set, with an additional 54-page booklet designed by Shinro Otake and Katsuhiro Kinoshita and the lyrics are printed both in Japanese and English, was also produced.

Track listing

Weatherbox Sampler
A CD sampler was released to promote the box set and is now itself a collectors item. It is housed in a slip-cased slimline jewel case and is notable for containing "Pop Song", a song that was not included in the box set itself, but released as a stand-alone single around the same time. "Pop Song" was later included on the compilations Everything and Nothing and A Victim of Stars 1982-2012.

References

Albums produced by Steve Nye
1989 compilation albums
David Sylvian compilation albums
Virgin Records compilation albums